Final Draft may refer to:

Final Draft (software), screenwriting software for writing and formatting a screenplay
Final Draft (novel), a 2007 novel by Russian writer Sergey Lukyanenko
Final Draft (film), a 2007 horror film starring James Van Der Beek